Chakora is a village in the Punjab province of Pakistan. It is located at 32°47'0N 72°43'0E with an altitude of 642 metres (2109 feet).

References

Villages in Punjab, Pakistan